Pollards Hill is a small residential district straddling south London boroughs of Croydon and Merton between Mitcham, Norbury and Thornton Heath. The boundary of the two boroughs is a street named Recreation Way.  No roads directly cross the Croydon and Merton divide, and streets were planned according to borough, leading to differing architectural or building schemes. It lends its name to a ward of the London Borough of Merton.

History
Mitcham Borough Council (MBC) dissolved in 1965 on incorporation into London. It helped to meet the post-World War II housing shortage, wrought by the London Blitz, by building prefabricated ‘Arcon’ bungalows at Pollards Hill. The first were ready by January 1946, meant to last about 10 years.  Many remained until the mid-1960s. The pre-fabs were mostly demolished in the 1960s, to make way for a new, high density, low-rise scheme that was constructed by Merton London Borough Council and Wimpey Homes between 1967 and 1971.

Separately, four landmark maisonette blocks were built by MBC in the 1950s on Yorkshire Road: Westmorland Square (1950), Castleton Road (1956) and between those years Hertford Way and Berkshire Way.

A branch library and community centre were built, which received a design award.

Governance

Councillors
Both sides of Pollards Hill elected Labour Party councillors at the last Council elections in May 2018.  At present in the local government re-warding process used nationally for the regular election of a delegation of councillors, it lends its name to a ward of the Merton.

UK elections (general elections and by-elections)
East and west have, since 1992 and 1997, respectively seen their relevant two seats in London, locally dependent wholly on borough, return Labour MPs.  The seats are Croydon North and Mitcham and Morden.  The narrower majority, narrowly, is in the latter; at all elections since 1997 the two seats have seen a greater than 28% Labour majority.

Geography
To the east (in Croydon), covering the sides of the hill, are larger houses, stretching towards central Norbury. The roads are lined with pollarded lime trees.

To the west (in Merton), at the foot of the hill, is the Pollards Hill estate stretching to Broad Green and Purley Way. A section of the estate was transferred to the ownership of Moat Homes housing association in 1998 under a stock transfer from the local authority. Moat has since demolished four maisonette blocks dating from the 1950s and is undertaking a wider regeneration of the stock.

Covering the crown of the hill is Pollards Hill Park, an open area of 7.75 acres (3.14 hectares), managed by Croydon Council, to whom it was donated in 1913. The park is the highest point in the Norbury area and can give views as far as Windsor Castle. A viewpoint at the top of the park indicates the direction of various landmarks.

Education
In September 2006, Harris Academy Merton opened on the former site of Tamworth Manor High School. The academy is on the Merton side but right on the Croydon border. Tamworth Manor High School was originally Pollards Hill Secondary Modern School built in the 1950s, which became a comprehensive school, Pollards Hill High School, in 1968.

Transport
The nearest railway stations are Norbury railway station and Streatham Common railway station & Thornton Heath railway station. Bus routes 60, 255 serve the eastern Croydon area & Buses 152, 463 serve the western merton area.

Demography
Pollards Hill is home to the largest Ghanaian British community in the UK on the Merton side according to the 2011 census, with 6% of the population and over 600 people born in Ghana. It has a large British Asian population on the Croydon side, and the area is home to many other different nationalities.

Culture and community
Pollards Hill on the Merton side also contains a wide range of community facilities including a library, community centre, youth centre and a neighbourhood police station, the first in Merton.

In 2005, a community cycling club was set up with help from the Commonside Trust. It won the London Cycling Campaigns' award for Best Community Cycling Initiative in 2006.

See also 
List of Parks and Open Spaces in Croydon
Mitcham Common
Cotelands

References

External links 
Croydon Council - Pollards Hill
Croydon Council - Pollards Hill History

Parks and open spaces in the London Borough of Croydon
Districts of the London Borough of Croydon
Districts of the London Borough of Merton